The Center for Disease Dynamics, Economics & Policy (CDDEP) is a public health research organization with headquarters in Washington, D.C. and New Delhi.  Its mission is "to produce independent, multidisciplinary research to advance the health and well-being of human populations in the United States and around the world."

Overview
CDDEP’s team of economists, epidemiologists, disease modelers, policy and risk analysts carry out research on malaria, tuberculosis, COVID-19, antimicrobial resistance, disease control priorities, environmental health, alcohol and tobacco, and various other topics.  Research is divided across four areas: disease dynamics and behavior, disease dynamics and information structure, delivery of new technologies for disease control, and innovative financing.

Two key CDDEP initiatives focus on antimicrobial resistance as a public health crisis. Within the United States, the Extending the Cure (ETC) project has received widespread media attention for work examining the costs of hospital acquired infections (HAIs) and designing novel incentive-based strategies to encourage antibiotic conservation. ETC researchers have contributed to Roll Call,  the Wall Street Journal, and the Baltimore Sun, among others.  In addition, The Global Antibiotic Resistance Partnership is developing actionable policy proposals on antibiotic resistance for five low- and middle-income countries: China, India, Kenya, South Africa, and Vietnam.

CDDEP staff are also well known in the field of malaria research.  Senior fellows were pioneers of the global subsidy idea that became Affordable Medicines Facility-malaria (AMFm), an innovative financing mechanism designed to expand access to the most effective treatment for malaria through the public, private and NGO sectors.  CDDEP has contributed to malaria elimination planning in Zanzibar, and to efforts to promote the use of multiple first-line therapies (MFTs) to slow resistance to antimalarial drugs.

Current projects

Extending the Cure
The Extending the Cure  (ETC) project is a research and consultative effort that frames the growing problem of antibiotic resistance as a challenge in managing a shared societal resource. The ETC inaugural report and its subsequent papers examine the range of issues around resistance and look at innovative policy solutions to encourage the conservation of antibiotics without stifling new drug development.

Extending the Cure is funded in part by the Robert Wood Johnson Foundation through its Pioneer Portfolio, which supports innovative projects that may lead to breakthrough improvements in health and health care.

Global Antibiotic Resistance Partnership
The Global Antibiotic Resistance Partnership (GARP) was started in 2009 to create a platform for developing actionable policy proposals on antibiotic resistance in low-income and middle-income countries.

During the first three years, Phase 1 of GARP established national working groups in four countries: India, Kenya, South Africa and Vietnam.  Those working groups—multidisciplinary, with representatives from all sectors, dealing with both human and animal antibiotic use—have become national resources for their expertise and linkages to the current global activities in antibiotic resistance. GARP Phase 1 culminated in the 1st Global Forum on Bacterial Infections: Balancing Treatment Access and Antibiotic Resistance on October 3–5, 2011, in New Delhi, India. Since GARP Phase 2 began in 2012, national working groups have been established in Mozambique, Nepal, Tanzania and Uganda.

The GARP secretariat at the Center for Disease Dynamics, Economics & Policy (CDDEP), in Washington, DC and New Delhi, provides technical support to each working group, creates links within the GARP network and involves the working groups in global discussions and policy development. GARP is a CDDEP project, funded by the Bill & Melinda Gates Foundation.

Affordable Medicines Facility--Malaria
The Affordable Medicines Facility-malaria (AMFm) is an innovative financing mechanism designed to expand access to the most effective treatment for malaria, artemisinin-based combination therapies (ACTs) through the public, private and NGO sectors. It will reduce the use of drugs that no longer work because of drug resistance, and reduce the use of artemisinin by itself, as monotherapy, thereby delaying the onset of resistance to that drug and preserving its effectiveness. AMFm is being managed by the Global Fund with directed financing from UNITAID, the UK Department for International Development (DFID), and other donors.

CDDEP researchers have been involved with the global subsidy idea behind AMFm since 2002, when the U.S. Institute of Medicine committee first deliberated on the questions of how to expand access to ACTs while maintaining the effectiveness of artemisinin compounds.

Disease Control Priorities Project

A joint effort of The World Bank, the Fogarty International Center of the National Institutes of Health, and the World Health Organization, with substantial technical input from CDDEP researchers, DCPP was launched in 2001 as a four-year initiative to improve the health of people in developing countries by identifying disease control priorities based on scientific evidence and cost-effectiveness.  Researchers at CDDEP were involved in carrying out the economic analysis for a number of chapters as well as in writing the cross-cutting chapter summarizing the main economic messages of the project, as well as the Lancet paper summarizing the main messages of the project.  CDDEP researchers also co-led DCPP in India.  That effort resulted in a book, “Choosing Health: An Entitlement for All Indians.” The overarching paradigm for DCPP is of quantitative evaluation of health system interventions and prioritizing interventions on the basis of cost-effectiveness.

Malaria Atlas Project--Elimination
A complement to the Malaria Atlas Project, this research seeks to develop an improved bio-economic model for trans-boundary malaria control financing that considers imported malaria. Research couples economic models to the stochastic spatial models largely based on malaria transmission intensity data assembled by the Malaria Atlas Project. Research includes modeling vectors and malaria transmission to develop the further spatial components. The end product of this effort will be the development of a tool for making estimates of malaria transmission intensity and burden as a function of financing strategies.

Golden Mustard
CDDEP’s Golden Mustard project, funded by the International Center for Tropical Agriculture (CIAT), Colombia, examines the potential impact of biofortification of mustard in India. The Indian context presents specific challenges: widely dispersed food production systems and sporadic health center access have hampered interventions to distribute vitamin A supplements, industrially fortified foods, or biofortified seed products in the past.  CDDEP’s Golden Mustard project looks at how mustard biofortification could be an advantageous addition to a portfolio of strategies to alleviate Vitamin A deficiency in this context.

Multiple First-line Therapies
If two drugs (in combination) are good, are three or more being used concurrently by different patients better at keeping drug resistance at bay? The question has practical consequences, as nearly every malaria-endemic country adopts a single first-line treatment (now, a combination drug) as policy. National policies are difficult to change and to implement in these relatively poor countries, and good evidence would be needed to adopt a more complex approach. CDDEP researchers began investigating MFT in 2006 using an evolutionary-epidemiological modeling framework. They compared MFT with single combination drugs and with cycling strategies where therapies are rotated, either on a fixed cycling schedule or when resistance levels or treatment failure become too high. Compared with these alternatives, the analysis predicts that MFT strategies will delay the emergence and slow the fixation of resistant strains.

Notable Work
The Center for Global Development describes CDDEP as a complement to "the CDC, WHO, and other agencies who fulfill basic surveillance and public health roles, but can’t give us much (if any) insight into the economic consequences of pandemic flu and other health disasters, nor can they use this insight to promote needed policy reform in the U.S. and globally."

Extending the Cure’s inaugural report Extending the Cure: Policy Responses to the Growing Threat of Antibiotic Resistance, has been widely debated at a series of consultations with representatives from the medical, insurance, pharmaceutical, government, and academic communities. It set the stage for continued research in the form of technical papers and policy briefs to prevent the impending health crisis of widespread antibiotic resistance.

ETC received national media attention for its study on the costs of Hospital-Acquired Infections, including coverage by NPR, ABC, CNN, and Reuters. Published in Archives of Internal Medicine, the study demonstrated that two conditions caused by HAIs killed 48,000 people and ramped up health care costs by $8.1 billion in 2006 alone.

The 2010 ETC-sponsored paper Fighting Antibiotic Resistance: Marrying New Financial Incentives to Meeting Public Health Goalswas cited by the Guardian as “a radical plan to save antibiotics.”  The study, published in Health Affairs, examined novel strategies for conserving antibiotics while also encouraging new drug development.

ETC research featured in the CDC's Emerging Infectious Diseases also received widespread national media coverage. The study found the community-associated strain of the deadly superbug MRSA—an infection-causing bacteria resistant to most common antibiotics—poses a far greater health threat than previously known and is making its way into hospitals. The new threat is easily picked up in fitness centers, schools, and other public places and has increased the overall burden of MRSA within hospitals. The study analyzed data from more than 300 microbiology labs serving hospitals all over the United States, found a seven-fold increase in the proportion of "community-associated" strains of methicillin-resistant Staphylococcus aureus, or MRSA, in outpatient hospital units between 1999 and 2006.

Former CDDEP Senior Fellow David L. Smith’s 2010 study in Nature, "Climate Change and the Global Malaria Recession", rebuked the widespread claim that climate change will be linked to increasing malaria incidence.

CDDEP researchers are contributing to the Lancet Series on Malaria Elimination as well as to the 5th report in Roll Back Malaria’s Progress & Impact Series.

CDDEP is known as a pioneer in researching Multiple First-line Therapies as a means of slowing the spread of drug resistance to antimalarials.

Key Researchers
Ramanan Laxminarayan is director and senior fellow at the Center for Disease Dynamics, Economics & Policy.  He is also a visiting scholar and lecturer at Princeton University. His research deals with the integration of epidemiological models of infectious diseases and drug resistance into the economic analysis of public health problems. He has worked to improve understanding of drug resistance as a problem of managing a shared global resource. Laxminarayan has worked with the World Health Organization (WHO) and the World Bank on evaluating malaria treatment policy, vaccination strategies, the economic burden of tuberculosis, and control of non-communicable diseases. He has served on a number of advisory committees at WHO, Centers for Disease Control and Prevention, and the [Institute of Medicine]. In 2003-04, he served on the National Academy of Science/Institute of Medicine Committee on the Economics of Antimalarial Drugs and subsequently helped create the Affordable Medicines Facility-malaria (AMFm), a novel financing mechanism for antimalarials. Laxminarayan received his undergraduate degree in engineering from the Birla Institute of Technology and Science in Pilani, India, and his master's degree in public health (Epidemiology) and doctorate in economics from the University of Washington in Seattle.

Arindam Nandi is an economist who focuses on health and development economics and in particular the long-term effects of health, nutrition, and physical activity in early childhood on cognitive, educational, and labor market outcomes in developing country settings. He has also evaluated the sex-selective abortion frequency in both the US and India and the sex-ration effects and potentially unintended effects of this procedure at the population level. In addition to being a fellow at CDDEP, Dr. Nandi is also a visiting scholar the Public Health Foundation of India, and he has worked with the World Bank and with the newly founded University of California Global Health Institute. He graduated with a PhD in Economics from the University of California, Riverside in 2010.

Eili Y. Klein is a fellow at the Center for Disease Dynamics, Economics & Policy and an assistant professor in the Department of Emergency Medicine at Johns Hopkins University. He has a PhD in ecology and evolutionary biology from Princeton University. Dr. Klein has authored papers on the burden and seasonality of methicillin-resistant Staphylococcus aureus (MRSA) as well as other pathogens such as carbapenem-resistant enterococci. Dr. Klein has also written about the problem of antimalarial drug resistance and the changing genomics of influenza. Dr. Klein has PhD from Princeton University in ecology and evolutionary biology.

See also
 Resources for the Future
 Malaria Atlas Project
 Bill & Melinda Gates Foundation
 Robert Wood Johnson Foundation

References

External links
 Extending the Cure (ETC) 
 Global Antibiotic Resistance Partnership (GARP)
 Center for Disease Dynamics, Economics & Policy (CDDEP)
 Resources for the Future (RFF)
 Robert Wood Johnson Foundation (RWJF)
 Bill & Melinda Gates Foundation

Medical research institutes in Washington, D.C.
Organizations established in 2009